China National Highway 104 (G104) runs from Beijing to Pingtan via Jinan, Xuzhou, Nanjing, Hangzhou, Taizhou and Fuzhou.

It runs to approximately 2606 km, and, on a map, runs southeast towards Nanjing and Hangzhou before turning south-southwest at Taizhou. In 2013, under a new 2013-2030 plan by NDRC&MoT, the G102 has been extended to Pingtan.

Leaving Beijing, it first runs as part of South Zhongzhou Road and is also known as Nanyuan Road (for being close to the Nanyuan area). However, it then diverts southwest and becomes the highway unto itself.

Route and distance

See also
 China National Highways

Transport in Fujian
104
Road transport in Beijing
Transport in Hebei
Road transport in Tianjin
Transport in Shandong
Transport in Jiangsu
Transport in Anhui
Transport in Zhejiang